Christopher John Lamborn (3 April 1916 – 7 August 1992) was an Australian rules footballer who played with North Melbourne, South Melbourne and St Kilda in the Victorian Football League (VFL).

Lamborn was recruited from Rochester in the Bendigo Football League in 1938.

Lamborn kicked more than 100 goals for Rochester in 1937.

Notes

External links 

1916 births
Australian rules footballers from Victoria (Australia)
North Melbourne Football Club players
Sydney Swans players
St Kilda Football Club players
Rochester Football Club players
1992 deaths